Preben Philipsen (18 January 1910 – 21 September 2005) was a Danish film producer. He produced 41 films between 1949 and 1975, and co-founded Constantin Film with Waldfried Barthel (de) in 1950. He was born in Copenhagen, Denmark to Constantin Philipsen and his wife Marie Helene (née Elster) and died in Klampenborg.

Selected filmography

 Willi Manages The Whole Thing (1972)
 The Body in the Thames (1971)
 Creature with the Blue Hand (1967)
 Don Olsen kommer til byen (1964)
 The Indian Scarf (1963)
 The Black Abbot (1963)
 The Squeaker (1963)
 Harry and the Butler (1961)
 Jetpiloter (1961)
 Our House in Cameroon (1961)
 The Devil's Daffodil (1961)
 Komtessen (1961)
 The Crimson Circle (1960)
 That Won't Keep a Sailor Down (1959)
 Tre må man være (1959)
 The Man Who Couldn't Say No (1958)
 Alt dette og Island med (1951)
 We Want a Child! (1949)
 Panik i familien (1945)

External links

1910 births
2005 deaths
Danish film producers
People from Copenhagen